The 2014–15 season was Manchester City Football Club's 113th season of competitive football, its 86th season in the top division of English football and 18th season in the Premier League since the league was first created with Manchester City as one of the original 22 founder-members.

Kits
Supplier: Nike / Sponsor: Etihad Airways

Kit information
The club entered the season being in the second year of a deal with the American manufacturer Nike, who would supply their kits until 2019.

Home: The new home kit remained broadly the same as the previous season. The main change related to the trim of the shirt, switching from white and navy stripes to thick navy blue bands on the neck and arms. In addition to this, sky blue shorts were used instead of the traditional white shorts.
Away: The away kit featured a fading pattern, running from navy blue to mid-blue, which were combined with yellow applications. The shorts and socks were navy blue as well.
Third: The third kit was in two shades of purple with a darker shade used on the collar and back of the strip, in line with Nike's new template used by its top teams. The two shades were separated by luminous yellow flashes.
Goalkeeper: Three goalkeeper strips were revealed for the 2014–15 campaign, with the first and second-choice strips being essentially negatives of each other. The primary kit was mainly yellow with a light green band on each arm surrounded by a white gradient pattern, the secondary kit was mainly green with a yellow band on each arm which was surrounded by a similar fading pattern, and the third kit was mainly black with red bands and the same gradient pattern.

Non-competitive

Pre-season

Friendlies

Summer in the Soccer Capital - Champions Shield

2014 International Champions Cup

Group B

Mid-season

Friendlies

Post-season

Friendlies

Competitions

Overall

FA Community Shield

Premier League

League table

Results summary

Results by matchday

Matches

FA Cup

League Cup

UEFA Champions League

Group stage

Knockout stage

Round of 16

Squad information

First team squad

 
Ordered by squad number. Appearances include all competitive league and cup appearances, including as substitute.

Playing statistics

Appearances (Apps.) numbers are for appearances in competitive games only including sub appearances
Red card numbers denote:   Numbers in parentheses represent red cards overturned for wrongful dismissal.

Goalscorers
Includes all competitive matches. The list is sorted alphabetically by surname when total goals are equal.

Correct as of match played on 25 May 2015

Awards

Premier League Golden Boot award 
Awarded to the player who has scored the most league goals at the end of each Premier League season

Premier League Golden Glove award 
Awarded to the player who has kept the most league clean sheets at the end of each Premier League season

Football Supporters' Federation Player of the Year award 
Awarded annually to the player chosen by a public vote on the Football Supporters' Federation website

CAF African Player of the Year award 
Awarded every calendar year from a shortlist of three based on a vote of the 56 CAF national team managers

Premier League Manager of the Month award
Awarded monthly to the manager who was chosen by a panel assembled by the Premier League's sponsor

Premier League Player of the Month award
Awarded monthly to the player chosen by a panel assembled by the Premier League's sponsor

Etihad Player of the Month awards 
Awarded to the player that receives the most votes in a poll conducted each month on the MCFC OWS

Associated Press International Team of the Week award
Awarded on a weekly basis to the team elected by vote of accredited Associated Press journalists as having made the best performance(s) of any global club

Associated Press International Player of the Week award
Awarded on a weekly basis to the player elected by vote of accredited Associated Press journalists as having made the best performance(s) of any global player

Transfers and loans

Transfers in

Transfers out

Premier League clubs have submitted their retained and released players lists for 2013–14 indicating which players will be released on 1 June 2014.

Loans out

References

2014–15
Manchester City
Manchester City